Nalgad (earlier:Tribeni Nalgad) is an urban municipality located in Jajarkot District of Karnali Province of Nepal.

The municipality is divided into total 13 wards.

The municipality was established on 10 March 2017, when Government of Nepal restricted all old administrative structure and announced 744 local level units as per the new constitution of Nepal 2015.

Dandagaun, Lahailll, Khagenkot, Ragda and Bhagawati Tol Village development committees were Incorporated to form this new municipality. The headquarters of the municipality is situated at Khagenkot

Demographics
At the time of the 2011 Nepal census, Nalgad Municipality had a population of 25,590. Of these, 99.3% spoke Nepali, 0.5% Magar, 0.2% Kham and 0.1% other languages as their first language.

In terms of ethnicity/caste, 32.1% were Chhetri, 24.1% Kami, 17.2% Magar, 15.0% Thakuri, 5.5% Damai/Dholi, 2.9% Hill Brahmin, 1.5% Sanyasi/Dasnami, 0.9% Sarki, 0.4% Badi, 0.1% Rai, 0.1% Gurung, 0.1% other Dalit and 0.2% others.

In terms of religion, 98.3% were Hindu, 1.0% Christian and 0.7% others.

References

External links
 Official website

Populated places in Jajarkot District
Municipalities in Karnali Province
Nepal municipalities established in 2017